R. Thyagarajan is an industrialist and founder of Chennai-based Shriram Group, a financial services conglomerate along with AVS Raja and T. Jeyaraman. He was awarded the Padma Bhushan, India's third highest civilian award, in 2013 in the field of trade and industry.

Career
He holds a master's degree in Mathematics and master's degree in Mathematical Statistics from the Indian Statistical Institute. In 1961, he started his career as a Trainee Officer with New India Assurance Co. Limited, a general insurance company. Following his stint, in 1974, he set up Shriram Chits to start commercial financing business along with his friends. Over the period of time, the business evolved into a ₹60,000 crore  entity. He also serves as the Chairman at Life Cell International and served as its Vice Chairman. He also serves as Director of TVS Capital Funds  Private Limited. He was a guest faculty for the Asian Institute of Insurance, Philippines, and Insurance Institutes in Singapore and Kuala Lumpur.

References

Recipients of the Padma Bhushan in trade and industry
People from Tamil Nadu
1937 births
Living people